The May 2005 Yangon bombings were nearly simultaneous bomb blasts that killed 11 people and injured 162 on 7 May 2005 in Yangon, Myanmar (Burma).

Bombings
On 7 May 2005, nearly simultaneous bomb blasts occurred at two supermarkets and a convention centre in Yangon. The first bomb blew up at an exhibition hall at Mingala Taungnyunt Township where a Thai trade fair was under way, killing three people including a Buddhist monk, and wounding many others. The second explosion tore through a City Mart supermarket in Mayangon Township and the final explosion struck in the Dagon Shopping Center near the Myaynigone Intersection.

Investigations
The authorities blamed the Karen National Union, the Shan State Army-South, the Karenni National Progressive Party and the National Coalition Government of the Union of Burma. The Karen National Union and the Shan State Army-South quickly denied responsibility.

References

2005 crimes in Myanmar
21st century in Yangon
Mass murder in 2005
Terrorist incidents in Asia in 2005
Terrorist incidents in Myanmar